Charles C. Stis [Pepper] (November 3, 1884 – January 9, 1979) was a baseball infielder, manager, scout and umpire.
 
Little is known about this man who spent more than six decades in professional baseball.
 
Stis began his baseball career as a Minor league second baseman in 1906, playing or managing for thirteen teams in nine different leagues through 1935.

Stis worked as an umpire in the minors and played with the St. Louis Terriers of the original Federal League in 1913. He also managed the Racine Belles of the All-American Girls Professional Baseball League for part of the 1945 season.

In addition, Stis scouted during 23 years for several Major League Baseball organizations, including the Boston Braves, Chicago White Sox, Detroit Tigers, Philadelphia Phillies, St. Louis Browns and St. Louis Cardinals.

Stis died in Festus, Missouri, at the age of 94. Nine years after his death, he became part of Women in Baseball, a permanent display at the Baseball Hall of Fame and Museum at Cooperstown, New York, which was unveiled in 1988 to honor the entire AAGPBL rather than individual baseball personalities.

Career timeline

Sources

External links

Beatrice Blues players
Boston Braves scouts
Butte Miners players
Fort Dodge Dodgers players
Holyoke Papermakers players
Hutchinson Salt Packers players
New Haven Prairie Hens players
Peoria Distillers players
Regina Red Sox players
St. Joseph Packers players
St. Louis Browns scouts
St. Louis Terriers players
Seattle Siwashes players
Springfield Midgets players
All-American Girls Professional Baseball League managers
Minor league baseball managers
Place of birth unknown
1884 births
1979 deaths
People from Festus, Missouri